Šimon Brixi (28 October 1693 in Vlkava – 2 November 1735 in Prague) was a Czech composer. He was the father of František Brixi.

Life
He was born in Vlkava. In 1720 he began to study law in Prague. He did not complete his studies, devoting himself rather to music. His artistic activity was linked with the musical life in Prague. In 1727 Brixi accepted the position of teacher and choirmaster at the St. Martin Church in the Old Town of Prague. The precise date of his death is unknown, but the registration of his funeral bears the date 2 November 1735.

Style
His compositions were intended almost exclusively for a church choir. Only about 21 of his compositions have been preserved. He wrote offertoria, gradualia, Regina Coeli, Salve Reginas, requiems, litanies, Te Deums, and church cantatas. In some of his works Brixi also thematically elaborated folk spiritual music. He was also interested in Italian baroque music; some of his copies of Neapolitan church compositions are preserved in the church archive at Mělník. Brixi was also influenced by the church compositions of Jan Dismas Zelenka. He composed his works both on Czech and Latin texts.

References

1693 births
1735 deaths
People from Mladá Boleslav District
18th-century classical composers
18th-century male musicians
18th-century musicians
18th-century Bohemian musicians
Czech Baroque composers
Czech male classical composers